In robotics, the wake-up robot problem refers to a situation where an autonomous robot is carried to an arbitrary location and put to operation, and the robot must localize itself without any prior knowledge.

The wake-up robot problem is closely related to the kidnapped robot problem.

See also 
 Exploration problem
 Simultaneous localization and mapping

References 

Robot control